The 2018 Utah Royals FC season marks the team's first year of existence and its inaugural season in the National Women's Soccer League (NWSL), the top division of the American soccer pyramid.

Background

Non-competitive

Preseason

Competitions

NWSL regular season

2018 NWSL

Overall table

Results summary

Results by round

Match results

March

April

May

June

July

August

September

Stats

Stats from NWSL regular season and NWSL playoffs are all included.

Honors and awards

NWSL Season Awards

 Defender of the Year: Becky Sauerbrunn 
 Best XI: Becky Sauerbrunn

NWSL Team of the Month

NWSL Player of the Month

NWSL Weekly Awards

NWSL Player of the Week

NWSL Goal of the Week

NWSL Save of the Week

Club

Roster

 Age calculated as of the start of the 2018 season.

Transfers
''

In

Out

Notes

Trialist

See also
 2018 National Women's Soccer League season

References

Utah Royals FC
Utah Royals FC seasons
Utah Royals FC
Salt Lake City